Ghjuvanni Quilichini (born 1 September 2002) is a French professional footballer who plays as a goalkeeper for  club Ajaccio.

Career
Quilichini is a youth product of the academies of Porto-Vecchio, ASPV, Sud FC, Bastia and Ajaccio. He began playing with Ajaccio's reserves in 2019. On 8 July 2022, he signed his first professional contract with Ajaccio for 1-year, and was promoted to third goalkeeper in their professional squad. He made his professional debut with Ajaccio in a 1–0 Ligue 1 tie with Stade Brestois 29 on 18 September 2022.

References

External links
 

2002 births
Living people
Sportspeople from Ajaccio
French footballers
Association football defenders
Ligue 1 players
Championnat National 3 players
AC Ajaccio players